There is currently one railway in Niger, built between 2014 and 2016 between Niamey and Dosso by the French Bolloré conglomerate. The objective was to connect Niamey to the rail network in Benin and thus to the coast. But competing commercial interests by several parties resulted in endless litigation and the connection to Benin never materialized. So the 145 km Niamey-Dosso stretch now lies orphaned and unused, with the tracks ending in the middle of nowhere some 6 km south of Dosso. After several years of neglect the tracks are already damaged to such an extent in some places, that they have become unusable. At the Niamey Terminus Station, the rails are kinked to such an extent by the summer heat that the train would not be able to leave the station (see image). 

A rail connection from Maradi into Nigeria is being considered.

Maps 
 UN Map

Built, but not operational
 Niamey terminus station (Niamey, capital of Niger). The station, officially inaugurated on 7 April 2014, is the first one opened in the country.
 Niamey, airport station.
 Guesselbodi station.
 Kouré station.
 Kodo station.
 Birni N'Gaouré station.
 Koygorou station.
 Dosso station.

Built and operational

in Benin
 ( gauge) 
  Cotonou (0 km) - port in Benin
  Parakou (438 km) - railhead in north

Proposed

From Parakou (Benin), to Dosso (Niger)
  Ndali 
  Kandi
  Guéné
  Lama-Kara
  Malanville
   border (574 km) near Niger River bridge.
  Gaya

From Nigeria 
 ( gauge
  Kano - junction (0 km) (capital Kano State)

  Dutse 
  Kazaure 
  Daura 
  Katsina (state capital Katsina State) 
  Jibia
   border 
  Maradi, Niger (capital Maradi Department (248 km)
  Niamey - national capital.
 .
 (existing narrow 1067mm gauge)
  Zaria - junction (0 km)
  Gusau - (capital Zamfara State)
  Kauran Namoda railhead

From Côte d'Ivoire via Burkina Faso
  Abidjan
   (border)
  Burkina Faso
   (border)
  Niamey

See also 
 Railway stations in Benin
 Railway stations in Nigeria
 Railway stations in Burkina Faso
 Railway stations in Côte d'Ivoire
 AfricaRail
 West Africa Regional Rail Integration

References

External links